Estoril Court Central is the main tennis court in Oeiras, Portugal. Built in 2005, it currently holds 10,000 spectators. It used to host the Portugal Open in May.

See also
 List of tennis stadiums by capacity

Tennis venues in Portugal
Sports venues in Lisbon District
Sport in Oeiras, Portugal
2005 establishments in Portugal
Buildings and structures in Cascais
Sports venues completed in 2005
Outdoor arenas